Baharia may refer to:

 Baharia, Bangladesh
 Baharia, Sicily
 Bahariya, an oasis in Egypt
 Camp Baharia
 Baharia (510), a T43-class minesweeper of the Egyptian Navy

See also
 Bahari (disambiguation)